The George Sumner House is a historic house at 32 Paige Hill Road in Southbridge, Massachusetts.  The -story late Federal wood-frame house was built sometime before 1830, probably for Major George Sumner (who is recorded as its owner in 1855).  Sumner was a leader in the early development of the textile industry in Southbridge, being the first in the area to offer as a service the complete cycle of woolen textile processing, although some work was still initially done in homes, not in a factory setting.  The house is notable for the fanlight window on the gable end, which is a late 19th-century addition.

The house was listed on the National Register of Historic Places in 1989.

See also
National Register of Historic Places listings in Southbridge, Massachusetts
National Register of Historic Places listings in Worcester County, Massachusetts

References

Federal architecture in Massachusetts
Houses completed in 1812
Houses in Southbridge, Massachusetts
National Register of Historic Places in Southbridge, Massachusetts
Houses on the National Register of Historic Places in Worcester County, Massachusetts